Luna Solomon (born 1996) is an Eritrean sport-shooter who qualified for, and took part in, the 2020 Olympic Games as part of the International Olympic Committee (IOC) Refugee Olympic Team.

Solomon fled Eritrea for Switzerland in 2015, and took up sport shooting through the Make a Mark project, founded by Italian triple Olympic gold medallist Niccolò Campriani. Solomon qualified for the 2020 Olympics and competed in the 10m air rifle event with Campriani as her coach. Solomon was last in the fifty competing shooters at the Olympics in her event.

Private life
Solomon lives in Lausanne, Switzerland and has a son born in 2020.

References

 

1996 births
Living people
Eritrean female sport shooters
Eritrean refugees
Eritrean emigrants to Switzerland
Shooters at the 2020 Summer Olympics
Sportspeople from Lausanne
Refugee Olympic Team at the 2020 Summer Olympics